The 3rd Corps is a field corps of the Turkish Army and the NATO Rapid Deployable Corps - Türkiye (NRDC-T). Headquartered at Ayazaga, Sarıyer in Istanbul, it is part of the First Army. It was established at Kirklareli on March 14, 1911, in the Ottoman Empire. It took part in the First Balkan War, the Second Balkan War, the Gallipoli Campaign, operations in the Caucasus 1916–1917, and operations in Palestine in 1918. It then took part in the Battles of Kutahya and Sakarya in 1921, and the Great Assault of 1922.

NATO Response Force
In 1941, the corps, as part of First Army, Catalca Area, with its headquarters at Çorlu, comprised 1st Infantry Division, 61st Infantry Division, 46th Infantry Division, and 62nd Infantry Division.

The corps received in 2001 orders from the General Staff for its transformation into a NATO Response Force Corps, which is a high-readiness, joint, multinational force that is technologically advanced, flexible, deployable, interoperable and sustainable. The process was completed in 2003, and it became one of the seven dedicated units of NATO. It was named NATO Rapid Deployable Corps- Turkey, abbreviated as NRDC-T. As a NATO Rapidly Deployable Corps, it is responsible to the Supreme Allied Commander Europe.

Between October 2003 and July 2004, it was assigned as NRF 1 and NRF 2, and between January–June 2007 as NRF 8.

The commander of the corps, Lt. General Ethem Erdağı was assigned as commander of International Security Assistance Force (ISAF) headquarters in Afghanistan between February and August 2005. The corps was assigned to the ISAF in Afghanistan between August 2008 and February 2009 as well.

Subordinate units
 52nd Tactical Armored Division (Hadımköy, Istanbul)
 2nd Armored Brigade (Turkey) (Kartal)
 3rd Armored Brigade (Çerkezköy) - seemingly 2016 coup attempt revealed 3rd Armd Bde was part of 52nd Division
 66th Mechanized Infantry Brigade (Turkey) (Istanbul) 
 23rd Tactical Motorised Infantry Division (Hasdal, Istanbul)
 6th Motorized Infantry Regiment (Hasdal, Istanbul) - existed as a division until at least 1992. Recep Tayyip Erdo%C4%9Fan reportedly did his military service with the 77th Infantry Regiment of the 6th Infantry Division.
 23rd Motorized Infantry Regiment (Samandıra, Istanbul)
 47th Motorized Infantry Regiment (Metris, Istanbul)

Notable commanders
 Mehmet Esat Bülkat (1862–1952), during the Dardanelles Campaign
 Refet Bele (1877–1967), commander  during the Turkish War of Independence
 Fahrettin Altay (1880–1974), commander during the Turkish War of Independence

Trials of the commanders
Former commander of 3rd Corps, Mustafa Ethem Erdağı, who also served as commander of ISAF in Afghanistan, was tried before a military court for allegations of abusing of his power while on duty at the 8th Corps in a construction tender held in the years 2002–2003. In May 2007, he was convicted for corruption to eleven and half months in prison. Erdağı became so the highest-ranked military officer in Turkey to be prisoned. He was forced to retire by the Supreme Military Council's annual meeting in August 2007.

In the Balyoz trial (literally: Sledgehammer trial) that began in 2010, retired General Ergin Saygun was arrested and indicted for his involvement in an alleged military coup plan to overthrow the Justice and Development Party government along with some other 365 military members, which reportedly dates back to 2003. At that time, he was the commander of the 3rd Corps. The court accused him for putting 3rd Corps headquarters as the center of the coup plan. General Saygun denied the accusations of the court with the defense that at that time he had taken orders to make arrangements for the conversion of the unit into a high readiness force headquarters assigned to NATO only. Therefore, they had no time for any plot preparations. Nevertheless, he was convicted and sentenced to 18 years in prison. However, he was released following a heart surgery due to his critical health condition.

In July 2016, Lieutenant General Erdal Öztürk, the corps commander at that time, was removed after the failed 2016 coup.

See also
 III Corps (Ottoman Empire), history of the unit during the Ottoman era.

References

https://medium.com/@turkmenterzi/meet-turkeys-shadowy-defense-minister-dogu-perincek-bf1e4021d6a1 - mention of general commanding 52nd Tactical Armoured Division, Yavuz Türkgenci, in 2016 "coup"

Corps of Turkey
Military in Istanbul
Military units and formations of Turkey in the Turkish War of Independence
Sarıyer
1911 establishments in the Ottoman Empire
Military units and formations established in 1911
NATO Rapid Deployable Corps